Ryu Hyun-kyung (born March 10, 1983) is a South Korean actress. She made her acting debut in 1996 at age 12 as the younger counterpart of the protagonist in the SBS TV series Oxtail Soup. In 2010, Ryu drew attention with her supporting roles in the erotic period drama The Servant and the romantic comedies Cyrano Agency and Petty Romance. Leading roles followed in Mama (2011), Two Weddings and a Funeral (2012), and Miss Cherry's Love Puzzle (2013).

Ryu also directed the short films Kwang-tae's Basic Story (2009) and Heart Robber (2010), as well as two music videos for the singer Jung-in.

Personal life
In March 2017, the agency of Ryu confirmed that Ryu and Park Sung-hoon are dating. On August 5, 2022, the couple announced broke up after 6 years of dating.

Filmography

Film

As actress

As director

Television series

Web series

Theater

Awards

References

External links
 
Ryu Hyun-kyung Fan Cafe at Daum 

1983 births
South Korean film actresses
South Korean television actresses
21st-century South Korean actresses
Living people
South Korean child actresses
People from Changwon
People from South Gyeongsang Province